The Voluson 730 is a diagnostic ultrasound machine known for its 3D and 4D imaging in Obstetric and Gynecological applications.

Early development 
The Voluson 730 was built upon technology developed in the 1980s by Kretztechnik, a company in Austria. Medison, an ultrasound manufacturer in South Korea purchased the Voluson line from Kretz and further developed it into the Voluson 530, then the Voluson 730.

Development by General Electric 
General Electric later purchased the Voluson 730 from Medison and continued to develop it, releasing it in May 2002 as Revision 1.05. Versions previous to 1.05 were produced by Medison. GE gave the Voluson 730 a distinctive industrial design based upon a circular work area colored blue, making it stand out considerably from other more staid looking designs of the time. GE continued to improve the Voluson 730 developing it up to Revision: BT08. GE ran ads heavily promoting the Voluson 730's 4D "babyface" capabilities and making it one of the most widely known ultrasound machines in the OB/GYN field. As of October 2011, GE still produces the Voluson 730 though it has created several upgraded successors such as the Voluson E6, Voluson E8, Voluson S6, and S8.

Versions 
The Voluson 730 was produced by GE in both the Professional, and Expert versions. The Expert added additional features not found on the Pro version, most notable an extra touchscreen LCD used for navigation.

References 

Medical testing equipment